Jüri Ignatjevitš Šehovtsov (born in 1952) is an Estonian politician. He has been a member of the X Riigikogu.

He is a member of the Estonian Centre Party.

References

1952 births
Living people
Estonian Centre Party politicians
Members of the Riigikogu, 2003–2007
Estonian people of Russian descent
Date of birth missing (living people)